The 13th British Academy Film Awards, given by the British Academy of Film and Television Arts in 1960, honoured the best films of 1959.

Winners and nominees

Best Film
 Ben-Hur 
Anatomy of a Murder
Ansiktet
The Big Country
Compulsion
Gigi
Look Back in Anger
North West Frontier
The Nun's Story
Sapphire
Some Like It Hot
Tiger Bay
Yesterday's Enemy
Maigret tend un piège
Ashes and Diamonds

Best British Film
 Sapphire 
Look Back in Anger
Anatomy of a Murder
Tiger Bay
Yesterday's Enemy

Best Foreign Actor
 Jack Lemmon in Some Like It Hot 
James Stewart in Anatomy of a Murder
Takashi Shimura in Ikiru
Zbigniew Cybulski in Ashes and Diamonds
Jean Gabin in Maigret tend un piège
Jean Desailly in Maigret tend un piège

Best British Actor
 Peter Sellers in I'm All Right Jack 
Laurence Olivier in The Devil's Disciple
Laurence Harvey in Expresso Bongo
Richard Burton in Look Back in Anger
Peter Finch in The Nun's Story
Stanley Baker in Yesterday's Enemy
Gordon Jackson in Yesterday's Enemy

Best British Actress
 Audrey Hepburn in The Nun's Story 
Kay Walsh in The Horse's Mouth
Sylvia Syms in No Trees in the Street
Peggy Ashcroft in The Nun's Story
Yvonne Mitchell in Sapphire

Best Foreign Actress
 Shirley MacLaine in Ask Any Girl 
Rosalind Russell in Auntie Mame
Susan Hayward in I Want to Live!
Ava Gardner in On The Beach
Ellie Lambeti in A Matter of Dignity

Best British Screenplay
 I'm All Right Jack - Frank Harvey , John Boulting and Alan Hackney 

Film013
1959 film awards
1960 in British cinema